The 1980 Southwest Conference baseball tournament was the league's annual postseason tournament used to determine the Southwest Conference's (SWC) automatic bid to the 1980 NCAA Division I baseball tournament. The tournament was held from May 17 through 20 at Olsen Field on the campus of Texas A&M University in College Station, Texas.

The number 1 seed  went 3–1 to win the team's second SWC tournament under head coach Cliff Gustafson.

Format and seeding 
The tournament featured the top four finishers of the SWC's 9 teams in a double-elimination tournament.

Tournament

References 

Tournament
Southwest Conference Baseball Tournament
Southwest Conference baseball tournament